The 1921–22 Gold Cup was the 10th edition of the Gold Cup, a cup competition in Northern Irish football.

The tournament was won by Linfield for the fifth time.

Group standings

References

1921–22 in Northern Ireland association football